"Back Seat (of My Jeep)" is a song by LL Cool J, released as a single on June 1, 1993, for Def Jam Recordings, taken from his fifth album 14 Shots to the Dome. It was produced and written by LL Cool J and QD III. The song samples a drum loop from The Detroit Emeralds 1973 song "You're Gettin' a Little Too Smart".

Reception
"Back Seat (of My Jeep)" was the most successful single from the critical and commercially disappointing album; it made it to 42 on the Billboard Hot 100 and 24 on the Hot R&B/Hip-Hop songs.  "Back Seat" was packed along with another single, "Pink Cookies In a Plastic Bag Getting Crushed by Buildings", which charted at a lower position (#96 Pop, #34 R&B).

The song was sampled in Monica's 1995 song "Don't Take It Personal (Just One of Dem Days)."

The music video for the single feature LL Cool J at a Drive-in theater (which closed in 1998) in Westbury, New York.

Track listing

A-side 
 "Pink Cookies In a Plastic Bag Getting Crushed by Buildings" (LP Version)- 4:17
 "Pink Cookies In a Plastic Bag Getting Crushed by Buildings" (Instrumental)- 4:12

B-side 
 "Pink Cookies In a Plastic Bag Getting Crushed by Buildings" (Remix)- 4:23
 "Pink Cookies In a Plastic Bag Getting Crushed by Buildings" (Remix Instrumental)- 4:23
 "Back Seat (Of My Jeep)"- 4:32

References

1992 songs
1993 singles
LL Cool J songs
Def Jam Recordings singles
Dirty rap songs
Songs written by LL Cool J
Songs written by Quincy Jones
New jack swing songs